Bohunt Chinese School was an experiment that took place at the Bohunt School in Liphook, Hampshire, United Kingdom, in 2015. The experiment involved fifty Year Nine students at the school being educated by Chinese teachers using traditional Chinese teaching methods for a period of four weeks. This included mostly lecture-based teaching and 12-hour shifts at school.

At the end of the experiment, the academic achievement of the 50-pupil group that received Chinese education was compared with an equivalent group of their peers through an assessment carried out by an independent board by a peer review. In the assessment, pupils in the Chinese-educated group performed 10% better than their other peers in maths, science, and Mandarin.

This experiment was broadcast by the BBC as part of a three-episode documentary.

References

Education in the United Kingdom